Islamia College Peshawar (ICP) is a public university located in Peshawar, Khyber Pakhtunkhwa, Pakistan.

Degrees awarded
Both Undergraduate and Postgraduate degrees are awarded at this university in the fields of Arts & Humanities, Business & Social Sciences, Language & Cultural, Engineering and Science & Technology.

This university is ranked no. 24 on the List of Top Universities in Khyber Pakhtunkhwa in 2022.

Recognized university
This university is recognized by the Higher Education Commission of Pakistan.

History
Founded by the personal initiatives led by Sir S.A. Qayyum and Sir George Roos-Keppel in 1913, it is one of the oldest institutions of higher education in Pakistan, and its historical roots are traced from the culminating point of the Aligarh Movement. The university provides higher learning in arts, languages, humanities, social sciences and modern sciences. In 1950, the University of Peshawar was founded as an offshoot of Islamia College Peshawar, with the later being associated to the university as a constituent college.  Initially established as Islamia College, it was granted university status by the Government of Pakistan in 2008; the word college is retained in its title for preserving its historical roots.

Cash Donations by Nawabs
On June 2nd 1911 a delegation headedSahibzaba Abdul Qayyum Khan visited Tangi Charsadda and setup his camp at the Hujra of Khan Bahadur Ghulam Haider Khan of Tangi for collection of donations. Khans of Tangi donated a handsome amount of Rs.25000 and the delegation stayed for 3 days at Tangi and them moved Umarzai village when donation of Rs.12000 was collected and then to Turangzai where Rs.20000 and from Rajar Rs.3000 and finally to village Charsadda. I total Rs 150,000 was collected from Hashtnagar. Subsequently, a large plot of land was purchased for the college building from the Khalil (Arbabs) of Tehkal Rs. 150,000/- from Nizam of Hyderabad and the construction cost building Paid by Nawab of Amb Rs 100,000/- was sent by the prime minister of Amb Syed Abdul Jabbar Shah to Sahibzada Abdul Qayyum as donation for the college.

Conception 
When the new province of Khyber Pakhtunkhwa (previously known as N.W.F.P) was formed in 1901 after its separation from the Punjab, there was only one college (Edwardes College) in whole province. This scarcity of quality educational institutions forced local youth to travel to faraway regions of the country (British India) in pursuit of higher education. This same lack of educational opportunities in the region motivated Nawab Sir Sahibzada Abdul Qayyum and Sir George Roos-Keppel to establish an institution that would not only cater to the academic needs of the region but also produce leaders from the region.

Tribal Hostel ICP
Founded by Iskander Mirza (Former President of Pakistan) on 7 July 1956. The hostel system of Islamia College University, Peshawar exists since 1913. Tribal Hostel is located in the center of Islamia College University, Peshawar.

History 
By 1909, as the idea of a college in the province was taking shape in the minds of both Nawab Sir Sahibzada Abdul Qayyum and Sir George Roos-Keppel, it was further strengthened by their visit to the Aligarh Muslim University the same year. Nawab Sahib asked the students, especially those from the N.W.F.P. who were studying there as to what were the problems they were facing there and how he could help them. The students told him that they needed a hostel. Nawab Sahib informed them that rather than building them a hostel at Aligarh, he would build them a college at Peshawar. Maulana Qutabshah was the first dean of the college.

Consequently, on April 12, 1911, Nawab Sahib arranged a meeting of like minded people in Peshawar at the residence of Abdul Karim, contractor at Peshawar city, which was attended by Ghulam Haider Khan of Tangi Charsadda, Habibullah Khan, Khushal Khan, Sethi Karim Bakhsh, Sir Sahibzada Abdul Qayyum, Khan Sahib Abdul Majid Khan and others. Sir Sahibzada Abdul Qayyum moved the motion for collection of contributions, which was instantly responded to by cash donations by all present.
Subsequently, a large plot of land was purchased for the college building from the Khalil (Arbabs) of Tehkal Rs. 150,000/- from Nizam of Hyderabad and the construction cost building Paid by Nawab of Amb Rs 100,000/- was sent by the prime minister of Amb Syed Abdul Jabbar Shah to Sahibzada Abdul Qayyum as donation for the college. 

Other chiefs and nobles of the North-West Frontier and Punjab, also made various donations.

Haji Sahib of Turangzai, the most famous Pukhtun religious leader of the time was requested by Nawab Sir Sahibzada Abdul Qayyum to lay the foundation stone of Islamia College. Haji Sahib agreed to the request, however, he had been declared a proclaimed offender by the British for his anti-British activities and his entry was banned into British controlled territory. He was residing in tribal territory, which was outside British control, so Nawab Sahib prevailed upon Sir George Roos-Keppel and the British to permit Haji Sahib to enter British controlled territory for one day so he could lay the foundation stone of Islamia College. The British agreed to this request with the understanding that Haji Sahib would return to tribal territory once he had laid the foundation stone. Haji Sahib was permitted to enter British controlled territory for the ceremony and spent the night in the 'Pokh' Mosque of Tehkal. At the foundation stone laying ceremony, Sir Roos Keppel and other British officials were present, so Haji Sahib hid his face in his sheet (Chadar) from them and was led by Sheikh Muhammad Ibrahim to the place where he was to lay the foundation stone. After laying the stone Haji Sahib went to Tehkal and then returned to the tribal territory.

Quaid-e-Azam Muhammad Ali Jinnah's will
Quaid-e-Azam Muhammad Ali Jinnah visited this College in 1936, 1945 and 1948. Quaid-e-Azam who became lifelong honorary member of the Khyber Union ICP in 1936 made the College one of the heirs of his property in 1939:

"All my residuary estate including the corpus that may fall after the lapse of life interest or otherwise to be divided into three parts - and I bequeath one part to Aligarh University - one part to Islamia College Peshawar and one part to Sindh Madrassa of Karachi ...
Quaid-e-Azam's Will, Bombay, May 30, 1939
Addressing the students of the college on April 12, 1948, he said: “Let me tell you that nothing is nearer to my heart than to have a great center of culture and learning in a place like Peshawar, a place from where the rays of knowledge and culture can spread throughout the Middle East and Central Asia.”

Incidents

Endowment

According to the Board of Trustees, the college, which is spread over 300 acres of land, has 1089 Jaribs cultivable land in Harichand, Rai Killi and Tarnab, (District Charsadda). In addition to this, there are 395 shops and flats in the Khyber Bazaar Peshawar and main bazaar Charsadda.

See also 

List of universities in Pakistan
Education in Pakistan
Army Burn Hall College
Khyber Medical College
University of Peshawar

References

External links 

 Official website of Islamia College, Peshawar
 Official website of University of Peshawar
 Islamia College

 
I
Educational institutions established in 1913
1913 establishments in India
British colonial architecture
British colonial architecture in India
Colleges in Peshawar
Universities and colleges in Peshawar